The 2000 Utah gubernatorial election took place on November 7, 2000. Incumbent Republican Mike Leavitt won reelection to a third term.

Republican primary

Candidates
Mike Leavitt, incumbent Governor
Glen Davis

Results

Democratic primary
Bill Orton was unopposed.

General election

Debates
Complete video of debate, October 1, 2000
Complete video of debate, October 12, 2000
Complete video of debate, October 16, 2000
Complete video of debate, October 19, 2000

Results

See also
2000 United States gubernatorial elections

References

2000
2000 Utah elections
Utah